Paranthrene simulans, the red oak clearwing borer, hornet clearwing or oak clearwing borer, is a moth of the family Sesiidae. It is found in eastern North America, from Nova Scotia to Florida, west to Minnesota, Missouri and Mississippi.

The wingspan is 27–40 mm. Adults emerge during June and July.

The larvae feed on chestnuts and oaks (including red and white oaks). They have a two-year life cycle. They attack the lower trunk of their host plant, attacks are most common between root flanges of large red oaks. Damage includes degrade, entries for decay and nursery cull. Pupation occurs within the gallery.

References

Sesiidae
Moths described in 1881